CLG Na Piarsaigh is a Gaelic Athletic Association club in County Galway. The club takes its name from the Irish revolutionaries Pádraic and Willie Pearse. Pádraic has a cottage in the area which over looks the club grounds. The club's crest includes the cottage and a swallow. The Swallow is taken for the short story he wrote set in ros Muc called Eoghainín na nÉan.

History
The club was formed in on Easter Sunday 1959 in the old school house of Camus, County Galway. The club colors of maroon and green were chosen to represent county and country, maroon for Galway and green for Ireland The catchment area is Ros Muc, Camus and Recess.

References